Deborah Ann Purcell is a retired American female mixed martial artist. She was formerly an assistant coach to the Southern California Condors of the International Fight League.

Early life
Purcell was involved in cheerleading, dance and competitive gymnastics throughout her early teens. She later quit gymnastics and took up Martial Arts. At the age of 17, she was introduced to Tae Kwon Do and this later introduced her to kickboxing, boxing and Brazilian Jiu-Jitsu.

She is actively involved in supporting women's MMA, having set up Fightergirls.com and the WMAA (Women's Martial Arts Association), along with being a world-class competitor herself. Purcell also started Fightergirls, her own extremely successful women's fitness and MMA apparel line, in which she designs every piece personally.

Purcell signed a three-fight deal with Elite XC. Her first fight was against Rosi Sexton at ShoXC: Suganuma vs. Hamman II on August 15, 2008. Purcell lost the fight by Split Decision.

Personal life
Debi married Brazilian Jiu-Jitsu fighter Ronald Assumpcao on July 11, 2009 in Las Vegas, Nevada. She also gained a stepson named Gustavo.

Accomplishments
 First woman to headline the world's first female MMA card HOOKnSHOOT
 First woman to ever compete and win in King of the Cage
 "Ultimate Wrestling" world Title Belt Holder
 Hook-N-Shoot Revolution Winner, 2002
 Headliner on the first ever all-women No Holds Barred (NHB) card in United States history
 "Ultimate Wrestling" Minnesota Winner and champion belt holder
 Black Belt in Ruas Vale Tudo (only female in the world)
 Black Belt in Taekwondo
 Only female coach in IFL history
 Current CEO of www.fightergirls.com the world's first female mixed martial arts website and store founded in May 2001 
 One of the first pioneers for Women's MMA
Built the first and original women's MMA website Fightergirls.com
Original founder of all women's MMA clothing and gear

Mixed martial arts record

|-
| Loss
| align=center| 4-2
| Rosi Sexton
| Decision (Split)
| ShoXC: Hamman vs. Suganuma 2
| 
| align=center| 3
| align=center| 3:00
| Friant, California
| 
|-
| Loss
| align=center| 4-1
| Hitomi Akano
| Decision (Unanimous)
| Smackgirl - Advent of Goddess
| 
| align=center| 2
| align=center| 5:00
| Tokyo, Japan
| 
|-
| Win
| align=center| 4-0
| Nicole Albrect
| Decision (Unanimous)
| KOTC 17 - Nuclear Explosion
| 
| align=center| 2
| align=center| 5:00
| San Jacinto, California
| 
|-
| Win
| align=center| 3-0
| Amy Pitan
| TKO (Punches)
| UW - Ultimate Wrestling
| 
| align=center| 1
| align=center| 1:41
| Minneapolis, Minnesota
| 
|-
| Win
| align=center| 2-0
| Christine Van Fleet
| Submission (Rear-Naked Choke)
| HOOKnSHOOT - Revolution
| 
| align=center| 1
| align=center| 2:42
| Evansville, Indiana
| 
|-
| Win
| align=center| 1-0
| Amber Mosely
| TKO (Punches)
| UW - Street Fight Minnesota
| 
| align=center| 1
| align=center| 1:16
| Saint Paul, Minnesota
|

Outside MMA
Purcell appeared on the fourth season of VH1's Celebrity Fit Club as a guest trainer. She also appeared on an episode of The Montel Williams Show in September 2007.

Purcell has a HVAC license and owns and runs an air-conditioning business. She also owns a clothing design store called Purpur Hollywood Aprons, which specializes in vintage aprons.

See also
List of female mixed martial artists

References

External links
 Fightergirls.com
 Official Site
 View Debi Purcell Video Highlights at Subfighter.com
 Debi Purcell Awakening Profile
 
 Ironlife Interview, May 2004
 TheFightGame.tv Interview, 2004 (video)
 ADCC Interview, 2004

American female mixed martial artists
American female taekwondo practitioners
American practitioners of Brazilian jiu-jitsu
People awarded a black belt in Brazilian jiu-jitsu
Female Brazilian jiu-jitsu practitioners
Year of birth missing (living people)
Living people
Mixed martial artists from California
Mixed martial artists utilizing taekwondo
Mixed martial artists utilizing vale tudo
Mixed martial artists utilizing Brazilian jiu-jitsu
Sportspeople from Huntington Beach, California
People from Laguna Niguel, California
21st-century American women